The Philippi Historic District (PHD) is national historic district located at Philippi, Barbour County, West Virginia, USA. It encompasses 113 contributing buildings and one contributing structure dating from the mid-19th century through early 20th century.  The district includes the commercial, ecclesiastical, and civic core of the town situated along the Tygart Valley River.

The PHD includes a number of buildings representative of popular architectural styles including Queen Anne, Italianate, and Greek Revival.  Located within the district are the separately listed Barbour County Courthouse, Philippi B & O Railroad Station, Philippi Covered Bridge, and Peck-Crim-Chesser House.

The PHD was listed on the National Register of Historic Places in 1990.

References

Commercial buildings on the National Register of Historic Places in West Virginia
Greek Revival architecture in West Virginia
Historic districts in Barbour County, West Virginia
Houses on the National Register of Historic Places in West Virginia
Italianate architecture in West Virginia
National Register of Historic Places in Barbour County, West Virginia
Queen Anne architecture in West Virginia
Houses in Barbour County, West Virginia
Historic districts on the National Register of Historic Places in West Virginia